The Gentlemen of Wolgyesu Tailor Shop is a 2016 South Korean television series starring Lee Dong-gun, Jo Yoon-hee, Shin Goo, Cha In-pyo, Choi Won-young, Lee Se-young, and Hyun Woo. The series aired on KBS2 every Saturday and Sunday from 7:55 p.m. to 9:15 p.m. (KST). The series served as Kim Young-ae's final work, as she died almost 2 months after the final episode.

Synopsis
The Gentlemen of Wolgyesu Tailor Shop is about a Tailor's shop that has been handed down from father to son and is about 50 years old. The Grandfather is desperate to keep the Tailor shop in the family, however his son is not keen and works for a corporate tailor's. The son is also married to the late Chairman's daughter. Once the Chairman dies, a host of power struggles between his wife and her brother and Stepmother ensue. Meanwhile, the Grandfather of the Tailor's shop decides to go on a sabbatical making made to measure suits for the poor and abandoning the Tailor's shop to his wife, daughter and 2 loyal employees. He leaves a letter asking them to sell the shop as he doesn't have the heart to. Eventually, the shop is placed in the hands of a former employee who agrees to run it until the Grandfather returns. The characters share their friendship as well as love at their workplace. Their values are in a sharp contrast to a corporate company that employs many and is seeped in many power struggles.

Cast

Main
 Lee Dong-gun as Lee Dong-jin
 Jo Yoon-hee as Nah Yeon-shil
 Shin Goo as Lee man-sool
 Cha In-pyo as Bae Sam-do
 Cha Ji-hoon as young Bae Sam-do
 Choi Won-young as Sung Tae-pyung / Sung Joon
 Hyun Woo as Kang Tae-yang

Supporting

People around Lee Dong-jin
 Kim Young-ae as Choi Gok-ji
 Oh Hyun-kyung as Lee Dong-sook
 Pyo Ye-jin as Kim Da-jung

People around Nah Yeon-shil
 Ji Seung-hyun as Hong Ki-pyo
 Jung Lyung-soon as Kyung-ja
 Lee Jung-eun as Geum Chon-daek

People around Bae Sam-do
 Ra Mi-ran as Bok Seon-nyeo

People from Meesa Apparel
 Park Joon-geum as Go Eun-sook
 Goo Jae-yee as Min Hyo-joo
 Lee Se-young as Min Hyo-won
 Park Eun-seok as Min Hyo-sang
 Cha Joo-young as Choi Ji-yeon

Extended

 Choi Song-hyun as Lee Yeon-hee
 Kim Ji-eun as Choi Ji-yeon's colleague announcer
 Lee Ga-ryeong as Jo An-na	
 Yang Dae-hyuk as Yoo Dae-ri
 Sung Ki-yoon as Park Boo-jang
 Han Seung-hyun as Nah Dae-ri
 Lee Joo-seok
 Baek Hyun-joo as 은숙네 가사도우미
 Kim Kwang-in
 Kim Da-sung as Geon Dal
 Yang Ji-in
 Son Joo-yeon
 Park Hee-gon
 Song In-seob
 Lim Jae-geun
 Kang Chan-yang
 Song Ha-rim
 Gong Yoon-chan
 Kwon Hong-seok
 Kim Sa-hoon
 Park Seo-bin
 Gong Jae-won
 Kim Mi-ran
 Kang Jung-koo
 Heo Sun-haeng
 Yoon Mi-hyang
 Lim Jung-ok
 Cha Sang-mi
 Yoon Ye-in
 Seo Jung-joon
 Song Jae-ryong
 Oh Jung-soo
 Lee Jae-wook
 Choi Beom-ho as Choi Cheol-ho's lawyer
 Choi Young
 Yang Dae-hyuk
 Seo Myung-chan
 Kim Tae-rang
 Kim Jae-heum
 Won Jong-seon
 Ahn Soo-ho
 Kang Chul-sung
 Lee Sae-ro-mi
 Yoo Geum
 Kim Doo-young
 Yoo Yong-bum
 Lee Jung-sung
 Kim Tae-young
 Jang Moon-suk
 Lee Seo-yool
 Choi Nam-wook
 Ji Sung-keun
 Son Gun-woo
 Park Chan-hong

Original soundtrack

Ratings 
 In this table,  represent the lowest ratings and  represent the highest ratings.
NR denotes that the drama did not rank in the top 20 daily programs on that date.

Awards and nominations

References

External links
  
 
 

Korean Broadcasting System television dramas
2016 South Korean television series debuts
2017 South Korean television series endings
Korean-language television shows
Television series by Pan Entertainment